The 1920 Virginia Orange and Blue football team represented the University of Virginia as a member of the South Atlantic Intercollegiate Athletic Association (SAIAA) during the 1920 college football season. Led by second-year head coach W. Rice Warren, who had helmed the team in 1913, the Orange and Blue compiled an overall record of 5–2–2 with a mark of 3–1 in conference play, tying for fourth place in the SAIAA.

Schedule

References

Virginia
Virginia Cavaliers football seasons
Virginia Orange and Blue football